Jafar Mahdavi is an Afghan politician. He was the representative of Kabul province during the 16th term of Afghanistan Parliament in 2010 and a member of the Enlightenment Movement of Afghanistan.

Early life 
Jafar Mahdavi was born in 1974 in Lal wa Sarjangal, Ghor, Afghanistan. He completed his university education up to his doctorate in sociology from University of Tehran in Tehran, Iran in 2005.

References 

Living people
1974 births
Hazara politicians
People from Ghor Province